The Gerber is an open-faced sandwich made in St. Louis, Missouri. The Gerber consists of a half section of Italian or French bread, spread with garlic butter and topped with ham and Provel cheese (the original sandwich was made with provolone), seasoned with a sprinkling of paprika and then toasted.

The "Gerber Special" was first made by the local family-owned Ruma's Deli, and named after their customer and next-store-neighbor, Dick Gerber. Mr. Gerber owned a tire store next to Ruma's Deli in the Covington Manor strip center, and the Rumas would allow him to create his own sandwich in their kitchen for a small fee. Dee and Tom Ruma were so impressed with the sandwich he concocted one day that they added the sandwich to the menu in 1973. The sandwich has been duplicated by many other St. Louis restaurants.

See also
St. Louis cuisine
Garlic bread
Open sandwich
Croque-monsieur
Ham and cheese sandwich
Panino
Zapiekanka
List of American sandwiches
List of sandwiches

References

American sandwiches
Cheese sandwiches
Cuisine of St. Louis
Italian-American cuisine
Cuisine of the Midwestern United States
Pork sandwiches
Open-faced sandwiches